Isabelle Debré (born 23 May 1957 in Lisieux, Calvados) was a member of the Senate of France from 2004 to 2017.  A member of The Republicans Party, she represented the Hauts-de-Seine department, in Île-de-France region.

References
Page on the Senate website

1957 births
Living people
People from Lisieux
Rally for the Republic politicians
Union for a Popular Movement politicians
The Social Right
French Senators of the Fifth Republic
Women members of the Senate (France)
21st-century French women politicians
Senators of Hauts-de-Seine